"Méchante" is a song by French-Malian singer Aya Nakamura. It was released on 16 June 2022.

Compositions
The song was written by Aya Nakamura and produced by twinsmanic.

Charts

References

2022 songs
2022 singles
Aya Nakamura songs
Songs written by Aya Nakamura